Prostanthera sejuncta is a flowering plant in the family Lamiaceae and is endemic to a small area of New South Wales. It is a scrambling, more or less prostrate, aromatic shrub with spiny branches, narrow egg-shaped leaves and pale mauve, pale lilac or almost white flowers.

Description
There are more or less sessile glands on the lower surface of the leaves.

Taxonomy
Prostanthera sejuncta was first formally described in 2006 by Mark Williams, Andrew Drinnan and Neville Walsh in the journal Australian Systematic Botany from specimens collected on Mount Arapiles. Specimens of this plant were previously included with P. spinosa, now considered to be endemic to Victoria.

Distribution and habitat
This mintbush grows in rocky soil near Copmanhurst in north-eastern New South Wales.

Conservation status
Prostanthera sejuncta is only known with certainty from Fortis Creek National Park and a nearby nature reserve and is listed as "vulnerable" by under the New South Wales Government Biodiversity Conservation Act 2016. The threats to the species include vegetation clearance, road and track maintenance, inappropriate fire regimes and the species' restricted distribution.

References

sejuncta
Flora of New South Wales
Lamiales of Australia
Plants described in 2006
Taxa named by Neville Grant Walsh